Koppigunta is a village in Katrenikona Mandal, East Godavari district, Andhra Pradesh state, India.

References

Villages in East Godavari district